Cycloctenus is a genus of Australasian araneomorph spiders in the family Cycloctenidae, first described by L. Koch in 1878. Originally placed with the nursery web spiders, it was transferred to the family Toxopidae because of the distinctive arrangement of its eyes, particularly the enlarged posterolateral eyes. It was moved to the Cycloctenidae in 1967.

Species
 it contains seventeen species:
Cycloctenus abyssinus Urquhart, 1890 – Australia (New South Wales)
Cycloctenus agilis Forster, 1979 – New Zealand
Cycloctenus centralis Forster, 1979 – New Zealand
Cycloctenus cryptophilus Hickman, 1981 – Australia (Tasmania)
Cycloctenus duplex Forster, 1979 – New Zealand
Cycloctenus fiordensis Forster, 1979 – New Zealand
Cycloctenus flaviceps L. Koch, 1878 (type) – Australia
Cycloctenus flavus Hickman, 1981 – Australia (Tasmania)
Cycloctenus fugax Goyen, 1890 – New Zealand
Cycloctenus infrequens Hickman, 1981 – Australia (Tasmania)
Cycloctenus lepidus Urquhart, 1890 – New Zealand
Cycloctenus montivagus Hickman, 1981 – Australia (Tasmania)
Cycloctenus nelsonensis Forster, 1979 – New Zealand
Cycloctenus paturau Forster, 1979 – New Zealand
Cycloctenus pulcher Urquhart, 1891 – New Zealand
Cycloctenus robustus (L. Koch, 1878) – Australia (New South Wales)
Cycloctenus westlandicus Forster, 1964 – New Zealand

References

Araneomorphae genera
Cycloctenidae
Spiders of Australia
Spiders of New Zealand